The 2017 mayoral election in Harrisburg, Pennsylvania was held on November 7, 2017, and resulted in incumbent mayor Eric Papenfuse, a member of the Democratic Party, being re-elected to a second term.

Background
Eric Papenfuse was elected mayor of Harrisburg in 2013.

Campaign
Papenfuse was challenged in the Democratic primary by Lewis Butts, political newcomer Anthony Harrell, former police officer Jennie Jenkins, and former Harrisburg City Council president Gloria Martin-Roberts. A debate featuring the Democratic primary candidates was held on May 2, 2017.

Papenfuse was unopposed in the general election.

Results

See also
 2017 United States elections
 List of mayors of Harrisburg, Pennsylvania

References

Harrisburg
 2017
Harrisburg